Leptothrix lopholea is a bacterium from the genus Leptothrix.

References

Burkholderiales